William Horton (24 August 1897 – 13 June 1974) was a British bobsledder. He competed in the four-man event at the 1924 Winter Olympics.

References

1897 births
1974 deaths
British male bobsledders
Olympic bobsledders of Great Britain
Bobsledders at the 1924 Winter Olympics
Sportspeople from Paris